Fritz the Cat is a 1972 American independent adult animated black comedy film written and directed by Ralph Bakshi in his feature film debut. Based on the comic strip by R. Crumb and starring Skip Hinnant, the film focuses on Fritz (Hinnant), a glib, womanizing and fraudulent cat in an anthropomorphic animal version of New York City during the mid-to-late 1960s. Fritz decides on a whim to drop out of college, interacts with inner city African American crows, unintentionally starts a race riot, and becomes a leftist revolutionary. The film is a satire focusing on American college life of the era, race relations, and the free love movement, and serves as a criticism of the countercultural political revolution and dishonest political activists.

The film had a troubled production history, as Crumb, who is a leftist, had disagreements with the filmmakers over the film's political content, which he saw as being critical of the political left. Produced on a budget of $700,000, the film was intended by Bakshi to broaden the animation market. At that time, animation was seen predominantly as a children's medium. Bakshi envisioned animation as a medium that could tell more dramatic or satirical storylines with larger scopes, dealing with more mature and diverse themes that would resonate with adults. Bakshi also wanted to establish an independent alternative to the films produced by Walt Disney Animation Studios, which dominated the animation market due to a lack of independent competition.

The film's depiction of profanity, sex and drug use, particularly cannabis, provoked criticism from more conservative members of the animation industry, who accused Bakshi of attempting to produce a pornographic animated film, as the concept of adult animation was not widely understood at the time. The Motion Picture Association of America gave the film an X rating (a recent equivalent to NC-17 rating films), making it the first American animated film to receive the rating, which was then predominantly associated with more arthouse films.

The film was highly successful, grossing over $90 million worldwide, making it one of the most successful independent films of all time. It earned significant critical acclaim in the 1970s, for its satire, social commentary and animations, although it also attracted some negative response accusing it of racial stereotyping and having an unfocused plot, and criticizing its depiction of graphic violence, profanity, sex and drug use in the context of an animated film. The film's use of satire and mature themes is seen as paving the way for future animated works for adults, including The Simpsons, South Park, Beavis and Butt-Head, and Family Guy.

A sequel, The Nine Lives of Fritz the Cat (1974), was produced without Crumb's or Bakshi's involvement.

Plot 
In the 1960s, at Washington Square Park in Manhattan, hippies gather to perform protest songs. Fritz a tabby cat, and his friends show up in an attempt to meet girls. When a trio of attractive female dogs walk by, Fritz and his friends exhaust themselves trying to get their attention with their music but are annoyed to find that the girls are more interested in the crow standing nearby. The girls attempt to flirt with the crow, making unintentionally condescending remarks about black people. After the crow snidely rebukes the girls and leaves, Fritz convinces the girls that he is a suffering soul and invites them to "seek the truth". They arrive at his friend's apartment, where a wild party is taking place. Since the other rooms are crowded, Fritz drags the girls into the bathroom and the four of them have an orgy in the bathtub. Meanwhile, two bumbling police officers (portrayed as pigs) arrive to raid the party. As they walk up the stairs, one of the partygoers finds Fritz and the girls in the bath tub. Several others jump in, pushing Fritz to the side, where he takes solace in marijuana. The two officers break into the apartment, but find that it is empty because everyone has moved into the bathroom. Fritz takes refuge in the toilet when one of the pigs enters the bathroom and begins to beat up the partygoers. As the pig becomes exhausted, a stoned Fritz jumps out, grabs the pig's gun, and shoots the toilet, causing the water main to break and flooding everybody out of the apartment. The pigs chase Fritz down the street into a synagogue. Fritz manages to escape when the congregation gets up to celebrate the United States' decision to ship more weapons to Israel.

Fritz makes it back to his dormitory, where his roommates are too busy studying to pay attention to him. He decides to ditch his bore of a life and sets all of his notes and books on fire. The fire spreads throughout the dorm, finally setting the entire building ablaze. In a bar in Harlem, Fritz meets Duke the Crow at a pool table. After narrowly avoiding getting into a fight with the bartender, Duke invites Fritz to "bug out", and they steal a car, which Fritz drives off a bridge, leading Duke to save his life by grabbing onto a railing. The two arrive at the apartment of a drug dealer named Bertha, whose cannabis joints increase Fritz's libido. While fornicating with Bertha, he realizes that he "must tell the people about the revolution". He runs off into the city street and incites a riot, during which Duke is shot and killed by one of the pig officers.

Fritz hides in an alley, where his older fox girlfriend, Winston Schwartz, finds him and drags him on a road trip to San Francisco. When their car runs out of gas in the middle of the desert, he decides to abandon her. He later meets up with Blue, a drug-addicted rabbit biker. Along with Blue's hippopotamus girlfriend, Harriet, they take a ride to an underground hide-out, where two other revolutionaries—the lizard leader and John, a hooded snake—tell Fritz of their plan to blow up a power station. When Harriet tries to get Blue to leave with her to go to a Chinese restaurant, he hits her several times and ties her down with a chain. When Fritz attempts to break it up, the leader throws a candle in his face. Blue, John, and the lizard leader then throw Harriet onto a bed to gang rape her. After setting the dynamite at the power plant, Fritz suddenly has a change of heart and unsuccessfully attempts to remove it before being caught in the explosion.

At a Los Angeles hospital, Harriet disguised as a nun and the girls from the New York park come to comfort him in what they believe to be his last moments. Fritz, after reciting the speech he used to pick up the girls from New York, suddenly becomes revitalized and has a foursome with the trio of girls while Harriet watches in astonishment.

Cast 
 Skip Hinnant as Fritz the Cat
 Rosetta LeNoire as Big Bertha / Additional voices
 John McCurry as Blue / John
 Judy Engles as Winston Schwartz / Lizard Leader
 Phil Seuling as Ralph / Additional voices
 Ralph Bakshi (uncredited) as Al / Narrator
 Mary Dean (uncredited) as Charlene / Dee Dee / Sorority Girls / Harriet
 Charles Spidar (uncredited) as Bar Patron / Duke the Crow

History of Fritz and the Movie 
R. Crumb was still a teenager when he made the character Fritz the Cat for self-published comics magazines he made with his older brother Charles. The character first appeared to a wider public in Harvey Kurtzman's humor magazine Help! in 1965. The strips place anthropomorphic characters—normally associated with children's comics—in stories with drugs, sex, and other adult-oriented content. Crumb left his wife in 1967 and moved to San Francisco, where he took part in the counterculture and indulged in drugs such as LSD. He had countercultural strips published in underground periodicals and in 1968 published the first issue of Zap Comix. Crumb's cartoons became progressively more transgressive, sexually explicit, and violent, and Crumb became the center of the burgeoning underground comix movement. Fritz became one of Crumb's best-known creations, particularly outside the counterculture.

Ralph Bakshi majored in cartooning at the High School of Art and Design. He learned his trade at the Terrytoons studio in New York City, where he spent ten years animating characters such as Mighty Mouse, Heckle and Jeckle, and Deputy Dawg. At the age of 29, Bakshi was hired to head the animation division of Paramount Pictures as both writer and director, where he produced four experimental short films before the studio closed in 1967. With producer Steve Krantz, Bakshi founded his own studio, Bakshi Productions. In 1969, Ralph's Spot was founded as a division of Bakshi Productions to produce commercials for Coca-Cola and Max, the 2000-Year-Old Mouse, a series of educational shorts paid for by Encyclopædia Britannica. However, Bakshi was uninterested in the kind of animation he was producing, and wanted to produce something personal. Bakshi soon developed Heavy Traffic, a tale of inner-city street life. However, Krantz told Bakshi that studio executives would be unwilling to fund the film because of its content and Bakshi's lack of film experience.

While browsing the East Side Book Store on St. Mark's Place, Bakshi came across a copy of R. Crumb's Fritz the Cat (1969). Impressed by Crumb's sharp satire, Bakshi purchased the book and suggested to Krantz that it would work as a film. Bakshi was interested in directing the film because he felt that Crumb's work was the closest to his own. Krantz arranged a meeting with Crumb, during which Bakshi showed Crumb drawings that had been created as the result of Bakshi attempting to learn Crumb's style to prove that he could translate the look of Crumb's artwork to animation. Impressed by Bakshi's tenacity, Crumb lent him one of his sketchbooks as a reference.

As Krantz began to prepare the paperwork, preparation began on a pitch presentation for potential studios, including a poster-sized painted cel setup featuring the strip's cast against a traced photo background, as Bakshi intended the film to appear. In spite of Crumb's enthusiasm, he was unsure about the film's production, and refused to sign the contract. Cartoonist Vaughn Bodé warned Bakshi against working with Crumb, describing him as "slick". Bakshi later agreed with Bodé's assessment, calling Crumb "one of the slickest hustlers you'll ever see in your life". Krantz sent Bakshi to San Francisco, where Bakshi stayed with Crumb and his wife Dana in an attempt to persuade Crumb to sign the contract. After a week, Crumb left, leaving the film's production status uncertain, but Dana had power of attorney and signed the contract. Crumb received US$50,000, which was delivered throughout different phases of the production, in addition to ten percent of Krantz's take.

Production

Funding and distribution 
With the rights to the character, Krantz and Bakshi set out to find a distributor, but Krantz states that "every major distributor turned it down" and that studios were unenthusiastic about producing an independent animated film due to the prominence of Walt Disney Productions in animation, in addition to the fact that Fritz the Cat would be a very different animated film from what had previously been made.

In the spring of 1970, Warner Bros. agreed to fund and distribute the film. The Harlem sequences were the first to be completed. Krantz intended to release these scenes as a 15-minute short if the film's funding was pulled; Bakshi was nevertheless determined to complete the film as a feature. Late in November, Bakshi and Krantz screened a presentation reel for the studio with this sequence, pencil tests, and shots of Bakshi's storyboards. Bakshi stated, "You should have seen their faces in the screening room when I first screened a bit of Fritz. I'll remember their faces until I die. One of them left the room. Holy hell, you should have seen his face. 'Shut up, Frank! This is not the movie you're allowed to make!' And I said, Bullshit, I just made it."

The film's budget is disputed. In 1972, The Hollywood Reporter stated that Fritz the Cat recouped its costs in four months following its release. A year later the magazine reported that the film grossed $30 million worldwide and was produced on a budget of $1.3 million. In 1993, director Ralph Bakshi said "Fritz the Cat, to me, was an enormous budget – at $850,000 – compared to my Terrytoon budgets." In an interview published in 1980, Bakshi stated "We made the film for $700,000. Complete".

Warner executives wanted the sexual content toned down, and to cast big names for the voices. Bakshi refused, and Warner pulled their funding from the film, leading Krantz to seek funds elsewhere. This led to a deal with Jerry Gross, the owner of Cinemation Industries, a distributor specializing in exploitation films. Although Bakshi did not have enough time to pitch the film, Gross agreed to fund its production and distribute it, believing that it would fit in with his grindhouse slate. Further financing came from Saul Zaentz, who agreed to distribute the soundtrack album on his Fantasy Records label.

Direction 

Bakshi was initially reluctant to direct Fritz the Cat because he had spent years working on animated productions featuring animal characters and wanted to make films focusing on human characters. He became interested in working on the film because he loved Crumb's work and considered him a "total genius". During the development of the film, Bakshi says that he "started to get giddy" when he "suddenly was able to get a pig that was a cop, and this particular other pig was Jewish, and I thought, 'Oh my God—a Jewish pig?' These were major steps forward, because in the initial Heckle and Jeckle for Terrytoons, they were two black guys running around. Which was hysterically funny and, I think, great—like Uncle Remus stuff. But they didn't play down south, and they had to change two black crows to two Englishmen. And I always told him that the black crows were funnier. So it was a slow awakening."

In his notes to animator Cosmo Anzilotti, Bakshi is precise, and even specifies that the crows smoked marijuana rather than tobacco. Bakshi states that "The weed had to read on screen. It's an important character detail." The film's opening sequence sets the satirical tone of the film. The setting of the story's period is not only established by a title, but also by a voiceover by Bakshi playing a character giving his account of the 1960s: "happy times, heavy times". The film's opening dialogue, by three construction workers on their lunch break, establishes many of the themes discussed in the film, including drug use, promiscuity, and the social and political climate of the era. When one of the workers urinates off of the scaffold, the film's credits play over a shot of the liquid falling against a black screen. When the credits end, it is shown that the construction worker has urinated on a long-haired hippie with a guitar. Karl F. Cohen writes that the film "is a product of the radical politics of the period. Bakshi's depiction of Fritz's life is colorful, funny, sexist, raw, violent, and outrageous."

Of his direction of the film, Bakshi stated, "My approach to animation as a director is live action. I don't approach it in the traditional animation ways. None of our characters get up and sing, because that's not the type of picture I'm trying to do. I want people to believe my characters are real, and it's hard to believe they're real if they start walking down the street singing." Bakshi wanted the film to be the antithesis of any animated film produced by the Walt Disney Company. Accordingly, Fritz the Cat includes two satirical references to Disney. In one scene, silhouettes of Mickey Mouse, Daisy Duck, and Donald Duck are shown cheering on the United States Air Force as it drops napalm on a black neighborhood during a riot. Another scene features a reference to the "Pink Elephants on Parade" sequence from Dumbo. A sequence of the camera panning across a garbage heap in an abandoned lot in Harlem sets up a visual device which recurs in Hey Good Lookin'.

Writing 
The original screenplay consisted mostly of dialogue and featured only a few changes from Crumb's stories. The script and storyboards went largely unused in favor of more experimental storytelling techniques. Bakshi said, "I don't like to jump ahead on my films. The way you feel about a film on Day One, you may not feel the same way forty weeks down the road. Characters grow, so I wanted to have the option to change things, and strengthen my characters  ... It was sort of a stream of consciousness, and a learning process for myself." Bakshi wrote the characters without feral animal behavior to lend the material greater realism.

The first part of the film's plot was adapted from a self-titled story published in a 1968 issue of R. Crumb's Head Comix, while the second part is derived from "Fritz Bugs Out", which was serialized in the February to October 1968 issues of Cavalier, and the final part of the story contains elements of "Fritz the No-Good", first published in the September/October 1968 issue of Cavalier. The last half of the film makes a major departure from Crumb's work. Animation historian Michael Barrier describes this section of the film as being "much grimmer than Crumb's stories past that point, and far more violent." Bakshi stated that he deviated from the comics because he felt that the strips lacked depth:

It was cute, it was sweet, but there was nowhere to put it. That's why Crumb hates the picture, because I slipped a couple of things in there that he despises, like the rabbis—the pure Jewish stuff. Fritz can't hold that kind of commentary. Winston is 'just a typical Jewish broad from Brooklyn'.  ... [The strip] was cute and well-done, but there was nothing that had that much depth.

Bakshi's unwillingness to use anthropomorphic characters that behaved like feral animals led him to rewrite a scene in "Fritz Bugs Out" where Duke saves Fritz's life by flying while holding Fritz; in the film, Duke grabs a railing before the car crashes into the river, a solution that Bakshi wasn't entirely satisfied with, but prevented him from having to use any feral animal behavior in that scene.

In the film, there are two characters named "Winston" – one appears at the beginning and end of the film, the other is Fritz's girlfriend Winston Schwartz. Michael Barrier notes that Winston Schwartz (who appears prominently in "Fritz Bugs Out" and "Fritz the No-Good") never has a proper introduction in Bakshi's film, and interprets the naming of a separate character as Bakshi's attempt to reconcile this; however, the two characters look and sound nothing alike. Bakshi intended to end the film with Fritz's death, but Krantz objected to this ending, and Bakshi eventually changed it to the final ending.

Casting 
The film's voice cast includes Skip Hinnant, Rosetta LeNoire, John McCurry, Judy Engles, and comic book distributor/convention organizer Phil Seuling. Hinnant, who would become known as a featured performer on The Electric Company, was cast because he "had such a naturally phony voice", according to Bakshi. Bakshi and Seuling improvised their dialogue as comically inept pig officers; Bakshi enjoyed working as a voice actor and later went on to provide voice roles for some of his other films. Bakshi re-created the voice he did in this film for the part of a storm trooper in his 1977 animated science fiction film Wizards.

Audio design 
Some scenes used documentary recordings which were made by Bakshi and edited to fit the scene; these were used because Bakshi wanted the film to "feel real". According to Bakshi, "I made tons and tons of tapes. ... When I went to have the film mixed, the sound engineers gave me all kinds of crap about the tracks not being professionally recorded; they didn't even want to mix the noise of bottles breaking in the background, street noise, tape hiss, all kinds of shit. They said it was unprofessional, but I didn't care." Although the sound designers insisted that Bakshi needed to re-record the dialogue in the studio, Bakshi refused to relent.

Almost all of the film's dialogue, except for that of a few of the main characters, was recorded entirely on the streets of New York City. For the film's opening sequence, Bakshi paid two construction workers US$50 each, and drank Scotch whisky with them, recording the conversation. In the Washington Square Park sequence, only Skip Hinnant was a professional actor; Fritz's friends were voiced by young males Bakshi found in the park. One of the sequences that was not based upon Crumb's comics involved a comic chase through a synagogue full of praying rabbis. For the voices of the rabbis, Bakshi used a documentary recording of his father and uncles. This scene continued to have a personal significance for Bakshi after his father and uncle died. Bakshi states, "Thank God I have their voices. I have my dad and family praying. It's so nice to hear now." Bakshi also went to a Harlem bar with a tape recorder and spent hours talking to black patrons, getting drunk with them as he asked them questions.

Music 

The film's score was composed by Ed Bogas and Ray Shanklin. The soundtrack was released by Fantasy Records and Ampex Tapes, along with the single, "You're the Only Girl" b/w "Winston". The film also featured songs by Charles Earland, Cal Tjader, Bo Diddley, and Billie Holiday. Bakshi bought the rights to use Holiday's performance of the song "Yesterdays" for $35.

Animation 

Many of the animators who worked on the film were professionals that Bakshi had previously worked with at Terrytoons, including Jim Tyer, John Gentilella, Nick Tafuri, Martin Taras, Larry Riley, and Cliff Augustine. According to Bakshi, it took quite a long time to assemble the right staff. Those who entered with a smirk, "wanting to be very dirty and draw filthy pictures", did not stay very long, and neither did those with a low tolerance for vulgarity. One cartoonist refused to draw a black crow shooting a pig policeman. Two female animators quit; one because she could not bring herself to tell her children what she did for a living, the other because she refused to draw exposed breasts.

In order to save money by eliminating the need for model sheets, Bakshi let animator John Sparey draw some of the first sequences of Fritz. Bakshi states that he knew that "Sparey would execute them beautifully." Poses from his sequences were photocopied and handed out to the rest of the crew. The film was produced almost entirely without pencil tests. According to Bakshi, "We pencil tested I'd say a thousand feet [of footage], tops. ... We do a major feature without pencil tests—that's tough. The timing falls off. I can always tell an animator to draw it better, and I know if the attitude of the characters is right, but the timing you really can't see." Bakshi had to judge the timing of the animation simply by flipping an animator's drawings in his hand, until he could see the completed animation on the screen. Veteran Warner Bros. animator Ted Bonnicksen was incredibly dedicated to his work on the film, to the point where he completed his animation for the synagogue sequence while suffering from leukemia, and would take the scenes home at night to work on them.

In May 1971, Bakshi moved his studio to Los Angeles to hire additional animators there. Some animators, including Rod Scribner, Dick Lundy, Virgil Walter Ross, Norman McCabe, and John Sparey, welcomed Bakshi's presence, and felt that Fritz the Cat would bring diversity to the animation industry. Other animators disliked Bakshi's presence, and placed an advertisement in The Hollywood Reporter, stating that Bakshi's "filth" was unwelcome in California. According to Bakshi, "I didn't know who these guys were because I was from New York, so I threw the ad away." However, Bakshi found the negative reaction to the film from his peers to be disheartening.

Cinematography 
Because it was cheaper for Ira Turek to trace photographs to create the backgrounds, Bakshi and Johnnie Vita walked around the streets of the Lower East Side, Washington Square Park, Chinatown and Harlem to take moody snapshots. Turek inked the outlines of these photographs onto cels with a Rapidograph, the technical pen preferred by Crumb, giving the film's backgrounds stylized realism that had never been portrayed in animation before. After Turek completed a background drawing in ink on an animation cel, the drawing would be photocopied onto watercolor paper for Vita and onto animation paper for use in matching the characters to the backgrounds. When Vita finished his painting, Turek's original drawing, on the cel, would be placed over the watercolor, obscuring the photocopy lines on the painting. However, not every background was taken from live-action sources. The tones of the watercolor backgrounds were influenced by the "Ash Can style" of painters, which includes George Luks and John French Sloan. The film also used bent and fisheye camera perspectives in order to replicate the way the film's hippies and hoodlums viewed the city.

Rating 
Fritz received an X rating from the Motion Picture Association of America (equivalent to the modern NC-17 rating), becoming the first American animated film to receive such a rating. However, at the time, the rating was associated with more arthouse fare, and since the recently released Melvin Van Peebles film Sweet Sweetback's Baadasssss Song, which was released through Cinemation, had received both an X rating and considerable success, the distributor hoped that Fritz the Cat would be even more profitable. Producer Krantz stated that the film lost playdates due to the rating, and 30 American newspapers rejected display advertisements for it or refused to give it editorial publicity. The film's limited screenings led Cinemation to exploit the film's content in its promotion of the film, advertising it as containing "90 minutes of violence, excitement, and SEX ... he's X-rated and animated!" According to Ralph Bakshi, "We almost didn't deliver the picture, because of the exploitation of it."

Cinemation's advertising style and the film's rating led many to believe that Fritz the Cat was a pornographic film. When it was introduced as such at a showing at the University of Southern California, Bakshi stated firmly, "Fritz the Cat is not pornographic." In May 1972, Variety reported that Krantz had appealed the X rating, saying "Animals having sex isn't pornography." The MPAA refused to hear the appeal. The misconceptions about the film's content were eventually cleared up when it received praise from Rolling Stone and The New York Times, and the film was accepted into the 1972 Cannes Film Festival. Bakshi later stated, "Now they do as much on The Simpsons as I got an X rating for Fritz the Cat."

Before the film's release, American distributors attempted to cash in on the publicity garnered from the rating by rushing out dubbed versions of two other adult animated films from Japan, both of which featured an X rating in their advertising material: Senya ichiya monogatari and Kureopatora, re-titled A Thousand and One Nights and Cleopatra: Queen of Sex. However, neither film was actually submitted to the MPAA, and it is not likely that either feature would have received an X rating. (Unlike the NC-17 rating, the MPAA never obtained a trademark on the X rating, thus any film not submitted to the MPAA for a rating can declare itself "Rated X.") The film Down and Dirty Duck was promoted with an X rating, but likewise had not been submitted to the MPAA. The French-Belgian animated film Tarzoon: Shame of the Jungle initially was released with an X rating in a subtitled version, but a dubbed version released in 1979 received an R rating.

Reception

Initial screenings 
Fritz the Cat opened on April 12, 1972, in Hollywood and Washington, D.C. Although the film only had a limited release, it went on to become a worldwide hit. Against its $700,000 budget, it grossed $25 million in the United States and over $90 million worldwide, and was at that point the most successful independent animated feature of all time. The film earned $4.7 million in theater rentals in North America.

In Michael Barrier's 1972 article on its production, Bakshi gives accounts of two screenings of the film. Of the reactions to the film by audiences at a preview screening in Los Angeles, Bakshi stated, "They forget it's animation. They treat it like a film.  ... This is the real thing, to get people to take animation seriously." Bakshi was also present at a showing of the film at the Museum of Modern Art and remembers "Some guy asked me why I was against the revolution. The point is, animation was making people get up off their asses and get mad."

The film also sparked negative reactions because of its content. "A lot of people got freaked out", says Bakshi. "The people in charge of the power structure, the people in charge of magazines and the people going to work in the morning who loved Disney and Norman Rockwell, thought I was a pornographer, and they made things very difficult for me. The younger people, the people who could take new ideas, were the people I was addressing. I wasn't addressing the whole world. To those people who loved it, it was a huge hit, and everyone else wanted to kill me."

Critical reception 
Critical reaction was mixed, but generally positive. Vincent Canby of The New York Times wrote that the film is "constantly funny  ... [There's] something to offend just about everyone." New York magazine film critic Judith Crist reviewed the film as "a gloriously funny, brilliantly pointed, and superbly executed entertainment ... [whose] target is ... the muddle-headed radical chicks and slicks of the sixties", and that it "should change the face of the animated cartoon forever". Paul Sargent Clark in The Hollywood Reporter called the film "powerful and audacious", and Newsweek called it "a harmless, mindless, pro-youth saga calculated to shake up only the box office". The Wall Street Journal and Cue both gave the film mixed reviews. Thomas Albright of Rolling Stone wrote an enthusiastic preview in the December 9, 1971 issue based on seeing thirty minutes of the film, declaring that it was "sure to mark the most important breakthrough in animation since Yellow Submarine". But in a review published after its release, Albright recanted his earlier statement and wrote that the visuals were not enough to save the finished product from being a "qualified disaster" due to a "leaden plot" and a "juvenile" script that relied too heavily on tired gags and tasteless ethnic humor.

Lee Beaupre wrote for The New York Times, "In dismissing the political turbulence and personal quest of the sixties while simultaneously exploiting the sexual freedom sired by that decade, Fritz the Cat truly bites the hand that fed it." Film critic Andrew Osmond wrote that the epilogue hurt the film's integrity for "giving Fritz cartoon powers of survival that the film had rejected until then". Patricia Erens found scenes with Jewish stereotypes "vicious and offensive" and stated, "Only the jaundiced eye of director Ralph Bakshi, which denigrates all of the characters, the hero included, makes one reflect on the nature of the attack."

On Rotten Tomatoes, the film has a score of 64%, based on 22 critic reviews, with an average rating of 5.6/10. The website's critical consensus reads, "Fritz the Cats gleeful embrace of bad taste can make for a queasy viewing experience, but Ralph Bakshi's idiosyncratic animation brings the satire and style of Robert Crumb's creation to vivid life."

Crumb's response 
Crumb first saw the film in February 1972, during a visit to Los Angeles with fellow underground cartoonists Spain Rodriguez, S. Clay Wilson, Robert Williams, and Rick Griffin. According to Bakshi, Crumb was dissatisfied with the film. Among his criticisms, he said that he felt that Skip Hinnant was wrong for the voice of Fritz, and said that Bakshi should have voiced the character instead. Crumb later said in an interview that he felt that the film was "really a reflection of Ralph Bakshi's confusion, you know. There's something real repressed about it. In a way, it's more twisted than my stuff. It's really twisted in some kind of weird, unfunny way.  ... I didn't like that sex attitude in it very much. It's like real repressed horniness; he's kind of letting it out compulsively." Crumb also criticized the film's condemnation of the radical left, denouncing Fritz's dialogue in the final sequences of the film, which includes a quote from the Beatles song "The End", as "red-neck and fascistic" and stated, "They put words into his mouth that I never would have had him say."

Reportedly, Crumb filed a lawsuit to have his name removed from the film's credits. San Francisco copyright attorney Albert L. Morse said that no suit was filed, but an agreement was reached to remove Crumb's name from the credits. However, Crumb's name has remained in the final film since its original theatrical release. Due to his distaste for the film, Crumb had "Fritz the Cat—Superstar" published in People's Comics later in 1972, in which a jealous girlfriend kills Fritz with an icepick; he has refused to use the character again, and wrote the filmmakers a letter saying not to use his characters in their films. Crumb later cited the film as "one of those experiences I sort of block out. The last time I saw it was when I was making an appearance at a German art school in the mid-1980s, and I was forced to watch it with the students. It was an excruciating ordeal, a humiliating embarrassment. I recall Victor Moscoso was the only one who warned me 'if you don't stop this film from being made, you are going to regret it for the rest of your life'—and he was right."

In a 2008 interview, Bakshi referred to Crumb as a "hustler" and stated, "He goes in so many directions that he's hard to pin down. I spoke to him on the phone. We both had the same deal, five percent. They finally sent Crumb the money and not me. Crumb always gets what he wants, including that château of his in France.  ... I have no respect for Crumb. Is he a good artist? Yes, if you want to do the same thing over and over. He should have been my best friend for what I did with Fritz the Cat. I drew a good picture, and we both made out fine." Bakshi also stated that Crumb threatened to disassociate himself from any cartoonist that worked with Bakshi, which would have hurt their chances at getting work published.

Legacy 
In addition to other animated films aimed at adult audiences, the film's success led to the production of a sequel, The Nine Lives of Fritz the Cat. Although producer Krantz and voice actor Hinnant returned for the follow-up, Bakshi did not. Instead, Nine Lives was directed by animator Robert Taylor, who co-wrote the film with Fred Halliday and Eric Monte. Nine Lives was distributed by American International Pictures, and was considered inferior to its predecessor. Both films have been released on DVD in the United States and Canada by Metro-Goldwyn-Mayer (the owners of the American International Pictures library via Orion Pictures) and the UK by Arrow Films. Bakshi states that he felt constricted using anthropomorphic characters in Fritz, and focused solely on non-anthropomorphic characters in Heavy Traffic and Hey Good Lookin', but later used anthropomorphic characters in Coonskin.

The film is widely noted in its innovation for featuring content that had not been portrayed in animation before, such as sexuality and violence, and was also, as John Grant writes in his book Masters of Animation, "the breakthrough movie that opened brand new vistas to the commercial animator in the United States", presenting an "almost disturbingly accurate" portrayal "of a particular stratum of Western society during a particular era, ... as such it has dated very well." The film's subject matter and its satirical approach offered an alternative to the kinds of films that had previously been presented by major animation studios. Michael Barrier described Fritz the Cat and Heavy Traffic as "not merely provocative, but highly ambitious". Barrier described the films as an effort "to push beyond what was done in the old cartoons, even while building on their strengths". It is also considered to have paved the way for future animated works for adults, including The Simpsons, Family Guy and South Park.

As a result of these innovations, Fritz was selected by Time Out magazine as the 42nd greatest animated film, ranked at number 51 on the Online Film Critics Society's list of the top 100 greatest animated films of all time, and was placed at number 56 on Channel 4's list of the 100 Greatest Cartoons. Footage from the film was edited into the music video for Guru's 2007 song "State of Clarity".

Home media
Fritz the Cat along with The Nine Lives of Fritz the Cat was released on VHS in 1988 by Warner Home Video through Orion Pictures. In 2001, MGM distributed the film with the sequel on DVD. The film again along with its sequel was released on Blu-ray by Scorpion Releasing and Kino Lorber on October 26, 2021, featuring a new audio commentary by comic artist Stephen R. Bissette and author G. Michael Dobbs.

See also 
 List of American films of 1972
 Arthouse animation

References

Works cited 

 
 
  - See profile at Google Books

External links 

 
 
 
 
 

Fritz the Cat
1970s American animated films
1970s black comedy films
1972 animated films
1972 controversies
1972 films
American adult animated films
American black comedy films
American International Pictures films
American political comedy films
American political satire films
American animated comedy films
Animated films set in New York City
1970s English-language films
American films about cannabis
Films based on American comics
Animated films based on comics
Films directed by Ralph Bakshi
Films set in the 1960s
Hippie films
American independent films
Film controversies
Obscenity controversies in film
Obscenity controversies in animation
Rating controversies in film
Yiddish-language films
Animated films about cats
Films produced by Steve Krantz
Films scored by Ed Bogas
1972 directorial debut films
1972 comedy films
1972 independent films
Films with screenplays by Ralph Bakshi
Adult animated comedy films